Sheykh Isa may refer to:
 Sheykh Isa, Khuzestan